Taragmarcha borbonensis is a moth of the family Oecophoridae.  It is endemic on the island of Réunion. The length is approx 7–10 mm and the wingspan is about 15–20 mm.

References

Oecophoridae
Moths described in 1957
Endemic fauna of Réunion
Moths of Réunion